The Alfred I. duPont–Columbia University Award honors excellence in broadcast and digital journalism in the public service and is considered one of the most prestigious awards in journalism. The awards were established in 1942 and administered until 1967 by Washington and Lee University's O. W. Riegel, Curator and Head of the Department of Journalism and Communications.  Since 1968 they have been administered by the Columbia University Graduate School of Journalism in New York City, and are considered by some to be the broadcast equivalent of the Pulitzer Prize, another program administered by Columbia University.

Dedicated to upholding the highest journalism standards, the duPont awards inform the public about the contributions news organizations and journalists make to their communities, support journalism education and innovation, and cultivate a collective spirit for the profession.

The duPont-Columbia Awards were established by Jessie Ball duPont in memory of her husband Alfred I. du Pont. It is the most well-respected journalism-only award for broadcast journalism; starting in 2009, it began accepting digital submissions. The duPont, along with the George Foster Peabody Awards, rank among the most prestigious awards programs in all electronic media.

The duPont-Columbia jury selects the winners from programs that air in the United States between July 1 and June 30 of each year. Award winners receive batons in gold and silver designed by the American architect Louis I. Kahn.  The gold baton, when awarded, is given exclusively in honor of truly outstanding broadcast journalism.

Notable winners
In 2003, the first-ever foreign-language program was awarded a duPont-Columbia Award: CNN en Español and reporter Jorge Gestoso won a Silver Baton for investigative reporting on Argentina's desaparecidos.

In 2010, the first award for digital reporting was given to MediaStorm and photographer Jonathan Torgovnik for "Intended Consequences" about children born of rape in Rwanda.

In 2012, the first-ever theatrically released documentary film was honored by the duPont jury: the Oscar-nominated Hell and Back Again, about the war in Afghanistan and the struggles facing veterans when they return home.

Note 
All winners are listed on the website of the Columbia University Graduate School of Journalism.

duPont Award

1942 
 Fulton Lewis Jr.
 KGEI Radio, San Francisco

1943 
 Raymond Gram Swing
 WLW Radio, Cincinnati
 WMAZ Radio, Macon, Georgia

1944 
 H. V. Kaltenborn
 WJR Radio, Detroit
 WTAG Radio, Worcester, Massachusetts

1945 
 Lowell Thomas
 KDKA Radio, Pittsburgh
 WNAX Radio, Yankton, South Dakota

1946 
 Elmer Davis
 WHO Radio, Des Moines, Iowa
 WFIL Radio, Philadelphia

1947 
 Edward R. Murrow
 WBBM Radio, Chicago
 WFIL Radio, Philadelphia

1948 
 Henry J. Taylor
 KLZ Radio, Denver
 WLS Radio, Chicago

1949 
 Morgan Beatty
 WNOX Radio, Knoxville, Tennessee
 WPIX-TV, New York
 WWJ Radio, Detroit
 Special Program Award—American Broadcasting Company and Association

1950 
 John Cameron Swayze
 AVZ Radio, Hartford, Connecticut
 WFIL-TV, Philadelphia

1951 
 Joseph C. Harsch
 WCAU Radio and WCAU-TV, Philadelphia
 WEEI Radio, Boston

1952 
 Gerald W. Johnson
 WBNS-TV, Columbus, Ohio
 WMT Radio, Cedar Rapids, Iowa

1953 
 Pauline Frederick
  WBZ Radio and WBZ-TV, Boston
  WOI-TV, Ames, Iowa

1954 
  Eric Sevareid
  KGAK Radio, Gallup, New Mexico
  WHAS Radio, Louisville, Kentucky

1955 
  Howard K. Smith
  WICC Radio, Bridgeport, Connecticut
  WTIC Radio, Hartford, Connecticut

1956 
  Chet Huntley
  KNXT-TV, Los Angeles
  WFMT Radio, Chicago

1957 
  Clifton Utley
  KARD-TV, Wichita, Kansas
  KRON-TV, San Francisco

1958 
  David Brinkley
  KLZ-TV, Denver
  WSNY Radio, Schenectady

1959 
  David Schoenbrun
  KOLN-TV, Lincoln, Nebraska
  WNTA-TV, Newark, New Jersey

1960 
  Edward P. Morgan
  KDKA-TV, Pittsburgh
  WAVZ Radio, New Haven, Connecticut

1961 
  Martin Agronsky
  KING-TV, Seattle
  KPFK Radio, Los Angeles

1962 
  Howard K. Smith
  KVOA-TV, Tucson, Arizona
  WFMT Radio, Chicago

1963 
  Louis M. Lyons
  WFBM Radio, Indianapolis, Indiana
  Silver Baton—WJZ-TV, Baltimore

1964 
  WFTV, Orlando, Florida
  WRCV-TV, Philadelphia

1965 
  Cecil Brown
  KTWO-TV, Casper, Wyoming
  WBBM-TV, Chicago
  WCCO Radio, Minneapolis
  WFBM-TV, Indianapolis, Indiana
  WHCU Radio, Ithaca, New York
  WRVR Radio, New York

duPont–Columbia Award

1969 
 Dr. Everett C. Parker
 KNBC-TV, Los Angeles, California, "The Slow Guillotine"
 KQED, San Francisco, for local coverage of the 1968 political campaigns
 National Educational Television and Public Broadcast Laboratory, "Defense and Domestic Needs: The Contest for Tomorrow"
 NBC News, "First Tuesday: CBW (Chemical-Biological Warfare): The Secrets of Secrecy" (produced by Tom Pettit)
 WRKL Radio, Mount Ivy-New City, NY for outstanding coverage of the 1968 political campaigns
 WSB-TV, Atlanta, Georgia "Investigation of Organized Crime"

1971
Kenneth A. Cox
CBS News, Ernest Leiser; Russ Bensley; John Laurence, "Charlie Company"
National Educational Television and Frederick Wiseman, "Hospital"
NBC News and Fred Freed, "White Paper: Pollution is a Matter of Choice"
WCCO-TV, Minneapolis, "Grunt's Little War"
WOOD-TV, Grand Rapids, Dick Cheverton and Herb Thurman, "Our Poisoned World"

1972
CBS News, John Sharnik and Eric Sevareid, "Justice in America" (parts one, two, and three)
Group W, George Moynihan and Susan Garfield, "All The Kids Like That: Tommy’s Story"
KUTV, Salt Lake City, Richard Spratling, Diane Orr and Fred Edwards, "Warriors Without A Weapon"
NBC News, William B. Hill and Tom Pettit, "First Tuesday: The Man from Uncle (Sam)" and "The FBI"
NBC News, Martin Carr, "White Paper: This Child is Rated X"
WABC-TV, Geraldo Rivera, "Drug Crisis in East Harlem"

1973
Mike Wallace for outstanding reporting on CBS News "60 Minutes"
CBS News, Perry Wolff, Robert Markowitz, and Charles Kuralt, "CBS Reports: ...But What If the Dream Comes True?"
Group W, Dick Hubert and Paul Altmeyer, "The Search for Quality Education"
KERA-TV, Dallas, for outstanding coverage of the 1972 political campaigns
National Public Affairs Center for Television, for coverage of the 1972 political campaigns
NBC News and Fred Freed, "White Paper: The Blue Collar Trap"
WABC-TV, Richard Thruston Watkins, "Like It Is: Attica -- the Unanswered Questions"
WNET-TV, New York, and Tony Batten, "The 51st State: Youth Gangs in the South Bronx"
WNJT-TV, Trenton, New Jersey, Ken Stein and John Dimmer, "Towers of Frustration: Assignment: New Jersey"
WTVJ-TV, Miami, "The Swift Justice of Europe" and "A Seed of Hope"

1974 
ABC News and Arthur Holch, "Inquiry: Chile: Experiment in Red"
CBS News, Irv Drasnin, "CBS News Reports: You and the Commercial"
Group W, Dick Hubert and Rod MacLeish "And the Rich Shall Inherit the Earth"
KGW-TV, Portland, Oregon, Pete Maroney, "Death of a Slideshow"
KNX Radio, Los Angeles, California, for editorials on important community issues
NBC News and Robert Northshield, "The Sins of the Fathers" (a segment of NBC Reports)
National Public Affairs Center for Television and Elizabeth Drew, "Thirty Minutes With..."
WBBM-TV, Chicago, Illinois, Judy Muntz, Jim Hatfield, and Lee Phillip, "The Rape of Paulette"
WTIC-TV, Hartford, Connecticut, Jean Sablon and Bard Davis "The Nine-Year-Old in Norfolk Prison"

1975 
ABC News, Av Westin, "Close-Up"
CBS News, Don Hewitt, 60 Minutes
KFWB Radio, Los Angeles, "SLA 54th Street Shootout"
KNXT, Los Angeles, "Why Me?"
NBC News, Fred Freed, "The Energy Crisis" (an NBC White Paper)
NBC News, Series of Reports on Feeding the Poor
National Public Affairs Center for Television, "Washington Week in Review"
National Public Affairs Center for Television, Watergate coverage
WNET-TV, New York and Frederick Wiseman, "Juvenile Court"
TVTV and WNET, New York and David Loxton, Lord of the Universe
WKY-TV, Oklahoma City and Bob Dotson, "Through the Looking Glass Darkly" (parts one, two, and three)
WPVI-TV, Philadelphia, "Public Bridges and Private Riches"

1976
KNBC, Burbank, California, Don Harris, "Prison Gangs"
NBC Nightly News and Tom Pettit for a series on feeding the poor
NPR, All Things Considered
WBTV, Charlotte, for news and documentary programming
WCCO, Minneapolis, Minnesota, David Moore, "Moore on Sunday"
WCCO Radio, Minneapolis, for news and documentary programming
WGBH, Boston,  Roger Fisher, "Arabs and Israelis"
WHEC, Rochester and Warren Doremus, "The Riots Plus Ten Years"
WKYC, Cleveland and Brian Ross, "Teamster Power"
WPLG, Miami and Clarence Jones, for crime reporting

1978 
Group W and Paul Wilkes, "Six American Families"
KCET-TV, Los Angeles, "28 Tonight,"
KGW-TV, Portland, "The Timber Farmers"
NBC News, "Human Rights: A Soviet-American Debate" (moderated by Edwin Newman) and "NBC Reports: The Struggle for Freedom" (anchored by Garrick Utley)
Walter Cronkite and the "CBS Evening News"
WBBM-TV, Chicago, Scott Craig and Bill Kurtis, "Once a Priest"
WFAA-TV, Dallas "Clear and Present Danger"
WNET-TV, New York and WETA-TV, Washington D.C., "The MacNeil/Lehrer Report" for "Carter's Energy Plan," "Woodward-Bernstein: Frost Interview," and "Korea and Congress: the Scandal So Far"
WNET-TV, New York "The Police Tapes"

1979
Associated Press Radio, "The New South: Shade Behind the Sunbelt"
KOOL-TV, Phoenix, Burt Kennedy, "Water: Arizona's Most Precious Resource"
KPIX-TV, San Francisco, Robert Klein and Richard Hart, "Laser Con-Fusion"
National Geographic Society and WQED-TV, Pittsburgh, "The Living Sands of Namib"
NBC News, Robert Rogers and Garrick Utley, "NBC News Reports: Africa's Defiant White Tribe"
WBBM-TV, Chicago, Illinois, Gail Sikevitz, Scott Craig, Jim Hatfield, and Mort Crim for documentary reporting
WFAA-TV, Dallas, Texas, Byron Harris for investigative report
WGBH-FM, Boston, "Banned in Chelsea"
WGBH-TV, Boston and William Cran, "WORLD: Chachaji: My Poor Relation" and John Angier, "NOVA: The Final Frontier"
WMHT-TV, Schenectady, "Capital Punishment: Inside Albany"
WPLG-TV, Miami and Clarence Jones for investigative reporting
Special Award: Richard Salant

1980 
ABC News, "Closeup: Arson: Fire for Hire!" (reported by Brit Hume) and "World News Tonight: Second to None?"
Bill Moyers, for outstanding reporting on CBS News and WNET-TV, New York
CBS News, "CBS Reports: The Boat People" (produced by Andrew Lack and reported by Ed Bradley) and "60 Minutes"
KCTS-TV, Seattle, "Do I Look Like I Want to Die?"
KDFW-TV, Dallas, for investigative reporting
KUTV-TV, Salt Lake City, "Clouds of Doubt"
KXL Radio, Portland, "The Air Space -- How Safe?"
WGBH-TV, Boston, "WORLD: F-16: Sale of the Century" on PBS (reported by Andrew Cockburn)
WHA-TV, Madison, Catalyst Films and Wisconsin Educational Television Network, "An American Ism: Joe McCarthy"

1981 
SILVER BATON ABC News, "The Iran Crisis: America Held Hostage"
SILVER BATON Ed Bradley and CBS News, "CBS Reports: Blacks in America: With All Deliberate Speed?"
SILVER BATON Group W and KYW-TV, Philadelphia, Pennsylvania; WBZ-TV, Boston, Massachusetts; WJZ-TV, Baltimore Maryland for I-Team Investigations
SILVER BATON Mississippi Center for Educational Television, Jackson, Mississippi, "William Faulkner: A Life on Paper"
SILVER BATON National Public Radio, "All Things Considered" and "Morning Edition"
SILVER BATON Perry Miller Adato and WNET-TV, New York, New York, "Picasso: A Painter's Diary" (parts one, two, and three)
SILVER BATON Red Cloud Productions and WGBY-TV, Springfield, Massachusetts, "Joan Robinson: One Woman's Story"
SILVER BATON Roger Mudd and CBS News, "CBS Reports: Teddy"
SILVER BATON Rueven Frank and NBC News, "White Paper: If Japan Can... Why Can't We?"
SILVER BATON Special Independent Production Award: Carol Mon Pere, Sandra Nichols and KTEH-TV, San Jose, California "The Battle of Westlands"
SILVER BATON Special Tribute: Walter Cronkite
SILVER BATON Walter Jacobson and WBBM-TV, Chicago, Illinois, "Perspectives"
SILVER BATON WLS-TV, Chicago, Illinois and Chicago Sun-Times, "The Accident Swindlers"

1982 
SILVER BATON ABC News, "America Held Hostage: The Secret Negotiations"
SILVER BATON CBS News, Charles Kuralt, "Sunday Morning"
SILVER BATON CBS News, Dan Rather, "CBS REPORTS: The Defense of the United States"
SILVER BATON David Productions and ABC News, "CLOSEUP: Can't it Be Anyone Else?" (produced by Bill Couturié)
SILVER BATON KCTS-TV, Dr. Willard Gaylin, "Hard Choices"
SILVER BATON National Public Radio, "Father Cares: The Last of Jonestown"
SILVER BATON Robert Spencer and WTTW-TV, Chicago, Illinois, "Six O'clock and All's Well"
SILVER BATON SPECIAL INDEPENDENT PRODUCTION AWARD: KTEH-TV, San Jose, California and John Else, "The Day After Trinity"
SILVER BATON SPECIAL TRIBUTE: David Brinkley
SILVER BATON WBBM-TV, Chicago, Illinois, "Election Night Coverage"
SILVER BATON WCCO-TV, Minneapolis, Minnesota, Dave Moore, The Moore Report
SILVER BATON WGBH-TV, Boston, Massachusetts, "WORLD"
SILVER BATON WPLG-TV, Miami, Florida, "The Billion Dollar Ghetto"

1984 
SILVER BATON CBS News, "60 Minutes: Good Cop, Bad Cop; Honor Thy Children; and Go Park It in Tokyo" 
SILVER BATON John Camp and WBRZ, Baton Rouge, Louisiana, For investigative reporting
SILVER BATON KCTS-TV, Seattle, Washington and Face to Face Productions, "Rape: Face to Face" 
SILVER BATON KRON-TV, San Francisco, California, "The War Within"
SILVER BATON National Public Radio, "The Most Dangerous Game: Nuclear Face-off in Europe"
SILVER BATON NBC News, "News Overnight" 
SILVER BATON Richard Threlkeld, Status Reports on "ABC World News Tonight"
SILVER BATON SPECIAL INDEPENDENT PRODUCTION AWARD: Jon Alpert and NBC News, "American Survival" (aired on Today)
SILVER BATON Terry Drinkwater, Cancer Reports on "CBS Evening News"
SILVER BATON WBBM-TV, Chicago, Illinois, "Killing Crime: A Police Cop-Out"
SILVER BATON WMAQ-TV, Chicago, Illinois, "Unit 5: The Chicago Police Investigations"
SILVER BATON WSMV-TV, Nashville, Tennessee, "Innocent Shame: The Legacy of Child Sexual Abuse"
SILVER BATON WTCN-TV, Minneapolis, Minnesota, "Herpes is Forever"

1985 
SILVER BATON ABC News, "Nightline"
SILVER BATON ABC News, "World News Tonight: US-USSR: A Balance of Powers"
SILVER BATON Brian Ross and Ira Silverman, Outstanding investigative reporting on NBC News
SILVER BATON CBS News, "60 Minutes: Lenell Geter's in Jail" 
SILVER BATON KOSU Radio, Stillwater, Oklahoma, "Selling the Public Spectrum"
SILVER BATON KRON-TV, San Francisco, California, "Climate of Death"
SPECIAL INDEPENDENT PRODUCTION AWARD: Medvideo, Ltd. and Group W, "Whispering Hope: Unmasking the Mystery of Alzheimer's"
Special Independent Production Award: Quest Productions and PBS, "The First Fifty Years: Reflections on US-Soviet Relations"
SILVER BATON Suburban Cablevision, Avenel, New Jersey, "Right to Know: Hillside: A Desegregation Story" 
SILVER BATON The Documentary Consortium and PBS "Frontline: Mind of a Murderer" 
SILVER BATON WGBH-TV and PBS, Boston, Massachusetts, "Vietnam: A Television History"
SILVER BATON WJXT-TV, Jacksonville, Florida, "The Smell of Money"
SILVER BATON WJZ-TV, Baltimore, Maryland, "Baby Boom: The Pig in the Python"

1986 
GOLD BATON ABC News, "Nightline: South Africa"
SILVER BATON Cable News Network and IMAGO, Ltd., "Iran: In the Name of God"
SILVER BATON CBS News, "CBS Evening News: Afghanistan: Operation Blackout" (with footage from Mike Hoover)
SILVER BATON Chris-Craft Television Productions and Churchill Films, "Down for the Count--an Inside Look at Boxing" (aired on Frontline)
SILVER BATON Desert West News, Flagstaff, Arizona, For a series of radio reports on the American Sanctuary Movement
SILVER BATON KNX Radio, Los Angeles, California, "Assignment 84/85"
SILVER BATON Nancy Montoya and KGUN-TV, Tucson, Arizona, For outstanding reporting
SILVER BATON NBC News, "The Real 'Star Wars'--Defense in Space"
SILVER BATON WCAU-TV, Philadelphia, Pennsylvania, Coverage of the MOVE siege 
SILVER BATON WCCO-TV, Minneapolis, Minnesota, "The Moore Report"
SILVER BATON WDVM-TV, Washington, DC, Investigation of Dr. Milan Vuitch
SILVER BATON WNET-TV, New York, New York, and PBS, "The Brain"

1987 
GOLD BATON CBS News, "CBS Reports: The Vanishing Family--Crisis in Black America", presented by Bill Moyers
SILVER BATON ABC News with Ted Koppel, "45/85"
SILVER BATON Chedd-Angier Production Company and The Documentary Consortium, "Frontline: Sue the Doctor? on PBS
SILVER BATON Drew Associates and PBS, "For Auction: An American Hero"
SILVER BATON KING-TV, Seattle, Washington, "Washington 2000"
SILVER BATON KTUL-TV, Tulsa, Oklahoma, "Tulsa's Golden Missionary"
SILVER BATON KYTV-TV, Springfield, Missouri, For outstanding reporting by Erin Hayes
SILVER BATON NBC News, Investigative Reporting on NBC Nightly News, citing the work of Brian Ross and Mark Nykanen
SILVER BATON NBC Radio News, For coverage of the American raid on Tripoli
SILVER BATON WBZ-TV, Boston, Massachusetts, "Afghanistan: The Untold Story" 
SILVER BATON WCBS-TV, New York, New York, "No Place to Call Home"
SILVER BATON WCCO-TV, Minneapolis, Minnesota, "State of Texas vs. Steven Lynn Fossum"
SILVER BATON WMAQ-TV, Chicago, Illinois, "Cicero: Community of Controversy"

1988 
GOLD BATON Blackside, Inc., Eyes on the Prize: America's Civil Rights Years, 1954-1965 
SILVER BATON ABC News, "20/20: By His Father's Hand: The Zumwalkts"
SILVER BATON CBS News, "48 Hours on Crack Street"
SILVER BATON Florence Films, "Huey Long"
SILVER BATON KMOV-TV, St. Louis, Missouri, "Sauget: City of Shame"
SILVER BATON NBC News, Robert Bazell, For Coverage of the AIDS epidemic
SILVER BATON Pam Zekman and WBBM-TV, Chicago, Illinois, For Investigative Reporting
SILVER BATON Roberta Baskin and WJLA-TV, Washington, D.C. For Investigative Reporting
SILVER BATON WCCO-TV, Minneapolis, Minnesota, For the I-Team
SILVER BATON WFAA-TV, Dallas, Texas, SMU Investigation
SILVER BATON WJXT-TV, Jacksonville, Florida, Jacksonville, Florida, "Jacksonville's Roads: The Deadly Drive Home"
SILVER BATON WLAP Radio, Lexington, Kentucky, "Passing On the Secret of Sexual Abuse"
SILVER BATON WPLG-TV, Miami, Florida, "Florida: State of Neglect"

1989 
GOLD BATON CBS News, "60 Minutes" 
SILVER BATON ABC News, "Nightline: In the Holy Land" 
SILVER BATON CBS News, Coverage of the Persian Gulf by Alen Pizzey 
SILVER BATON KING-TV, Seattle, Washington, "Looking for Lincoln" 
SILVER BATON NBC News, "A Conversation with Mikhail Gorbachev 
SILVER BATON Nina Totenberg and National Public Radio, Coverage of the Supreme Court Nominations 
SILVER BATON Public Affairs Television and Alvin H. Perlmutter, Inc., "Joseph Campbell and the Power of Myth with Bill Moyers" 
SILVER BATON WCAX-TV, Burlington, Vermont, "The Politics of Pollution" 
SILVER BATON WCVB-TV, Needham, Massachusetts, "We the Jury", reported by David Ropeik
SILVER BATON WSMV-TV, Nashville, TN, for investigative reporting by Erin Hayes 
SILVER BATON WUSA-TV, Washington, D.C. "Thurgood Marshall: The Man", reported by Carl Rowan
SILVER BATON WWOR-TV, Secaucus, New Jersey, "For the I-Team"

1990 
GOLD BATON WGBH and Frontline: "Remember My Lai," "The Spy Who Broke the Code," "Who Profits From Drugs?," "The Choice," and "Children of the Night"
SILVER BATON ABC News and Koppel Communications, "The Koppel Report: Tragedy at Tiananmen--The Untold Story" 
SILVER BATON Byron Harris and WFAA-TV, Dallas, Texas, "Other People's Money"
SILVER BATON CBS, Television and Radio Coverage of China 
SILVER BATON CNN, Coverage of China
SILVER BATON Gardner Films and WETA, Washington, D.C., "Arab and Jew: Wounded Spirits in a Promised Land" on PBS 
SILVER BATON KCET-TV, Los Angeles, California, "For the Sake of Appearances," and "Expecting Miracles"
SILVER BATON Kentucky Educational Television, "On Our Own Land" (produced by Appalshop)
SILVER BATON Maryland Public Television, Owings Mills, Maryland, "Other Faces of AIDS" 
SILVER BATON National Public Radio, "AIDS and Black America: Breaking the Silence"
SILVER BATON WBRZ, Baton Rouge, Louisiana, "The Best Insurance Commissioner Money Can Buy" 
SILVER BATON WJXT, Jacksonville, Florida, "Crack Crisis: A Cry for Action"

1991 
GOLD BATON WGBH-TV and Martin Smith Productions, "Frontline: Inside Gorbachev's USSR with Hedrick Smith"
SILVER BATON ABC News, "Peter Jennings Reporting: From the Killing Fields" 
SILVER BATON Blackside Inc., "Eyes on the Prize II: America at the Racial Crossroads"
SILVER BATON CBS News, "CBS Evening News with Dan Rather" for human stories behind the fall of Communist governments (reported by Dan Rather, Tom Fenton, Betsy Aaron, Anthony Mason and Peter Van Sant)
SILVER BATON Exit Films, Cambridge, Massachusetts, "Near Death"
SILVER BATON Helen Borten and National Public Radio for "Horizons: And Justice for All"
SILVER BATON KCBS-AM, San Francisco, California, for coverage of the earthquake
SILVER BATON KING-TV, Seattle, Washington, "Critical Choices: America's Health Care Crisis"
SILVER BATON KQED-TV, San Francisco, California, Scott Pearson and Lewis Cohen, "Express: Shield for Abuse"
SILVER BATON NBC News, "NBC Nightly News: Tragedy at Pine Ridge" (reported by Betty Rollin)
SILVER BATON P.O.V. and WTVS-TV, "Who Killed Vincent Chin??
SILVER BATON WCBD-TV, Charleston, South Carolina, Coverage of Hurricane Hugo
SILVER BATON WJLA-TV, Washington D.C., "NFL Drug Testing: Illegal Procedure", for reporting on Forest Tennant by Roberta Baskin
SILVER BATON WKYC-TV, Cleveland, Ohio, Dick Feagler for nightly commentaries

1992 
GOLD BATON PBS, Public Affairs Television, Bill Moyers, "After the War," "The Home Front," "Beyond Hate," "Amazing Grace"
SILVER BATON ABC News, Peter Jennings, "A Line in the Sand: War or Peace?", "World News Tonight: Children in Crisis" and "World News Tonight: War in the Gulf: Answering Children's Questions"
SILVER BATON CNN, Peter Arnett's Reports from Baghdad
SILVER BATON KBDI-TV, Denver, Colorado, Carolyn Hales, Tierra O Muerte: Land or Death
SILVER BATON KPIX-TV, San Francisco, Richard Saiz, California, "Wards of the State"
SILVER BATON KWWL-TV, Waterloo, Iowa, "Cloud of Concern"
SILVER BATON National Public Radio for coverage of the Gulf War
SILVER BATON PBS, Friends of Le Chambon, Pierre Sauvage, "Weapons of the Spirit"
SILVER BATON PBS, Frontline: High Crimes and Misdemeanors (reported by Bill Moyers)
SILVER BATON WETA-TV and Florentine Films, Ken Burns, "The Civil War"
SILVER BATON WFAA-TV, Dallas, Texas, Coverage of the Gulf War
SILVER BATON WGBH-TV, Boston, Massachusetts, "Frontline: Innocence Lost" (produced by Ofra Bikel)
SILVER BATON WTBS-TV, National Geographic Society, "Explorer: The Urban Gorilla"

1993 
GOLD BATON National Public Radio, "All Things Considered," "Morning Edition," "Weekend Edition," Coverage of Clarence Thomas Nomination Hearings, Coverage of the 1992 Los Angeles Riots and Aftermath, Voices from the Backstairs, American Folklife Radio Project, and The Case Against Women: Sexism in the Court
SILVER BATON ABC News, "Nightline" Coverage of the Los Angeles Riots
SILVER BATON Bill Leonard, former producer at CBS News and director of the duPont Awards
SILVER BATON CBS News, "60 Minutes: Made in China" (reported by Ed Bradley)
SILVER BATON David Grubin Productions and KERA-TV, Dallas, Texas, "The American Experience: LBJ" on PBS
SILVER BATON HBO, "Abortion: Desperate Choices" (America Undercover) (directed by Susan Froemke, Albert Maysles, and Deborah Dickson)
SILVER BATON KCNC-TV, Denver, Colorado, "Erin's Life"
SILVER BATON Kitchell Films and "P.O.V.", "Berkeley in the Sixties"
SILVER BATON KSTP-TV, St. Paul, Minnesota, "Who's Watching the Store"
SILVER BATON KTTV-TV, Los Angeles, California, "Cops on Trial: The Rodney King Case"
SILVER BATON Louisiana Public Broadcasting, Baton Rouge, Louisiana "Louisiana Boys" (produced by the Center for New American Media)
SILVER BATON Lucky Duck Productions and Nickelodeon, "Nick News: W/5"
SILVER BATON WCPO-TV, Cincinnati, Ohio, "Made in the USA?" 
SILVER BATON WCVB-TV, Boston, Massachusetts, "Chronicle" and Environmental Reporting (by David Ropeik)
SILVER BATON WGBH-TV, Boston, Massachusetts, "Frontline: Who Killed Adam Mann?"

1994 
GOLD BATON Fred Friendly, winner for his lifetime contribution to the ethics and practice of journalism
SILVER BATON ABC News, "20/20: The Gift of Life" (Bob Brown, reporter)
SILVER BATON CNN, Coverage of Bosnia by Christiane Amanpour, Jim Clancy, Brent Sadler, and Jackie Shymanski
SILVER BATON ETC Films, Barbara Kopple, "Fallen Champ: The Untold Story of Mike Tyson" on NBC
SILVER BATON KRON-TV, San Francisco, "In the Shadow of the Wall"
SILVER BATON M.W. Productions, KQED "Harry Bridges: A Man and His Union" (directed by Berry Minott)
SILVER BATON PBS and Jigsaw Productions, "The Pacific Century"
SILVER BATON WBAI/Pacifica Radio for "Massacre: The Story of East Timor" (produced by Amy Goodman and Allan Nairn)
SILVER BATON WBFF-TV, Baltimore, Maryland, "Justice on Trial/The Lost Generation/Walking Wounded" (reported by Deborah Weiner)
SILVER BATON WGBH-TV, Boston, Massachusetts, "Frontline," The Best Campaign Money Can Buy (produced by the Center for Investigative Reporting)
SILVER BATON Wisconsin Public Television, "Move Over: Women and the '92 Campaign"
SILVER BATON WPLG-TV, Miami, Florida, "Armed Enemies of Castro"
SILVER BATON WTVJ-TV, Miami, Florida The Coverage of Hurricane Andrew

1995 
GOLD BATON ABC News
"World News Tonight: Coverage of Haiti by Linda Pattillo" 
"American Agenda: Women's Health Week" (Sally Holm, Rick Kaplan, Jackie Judd, Tim Johnson, George Strait)
"Day One: Smoke Screen" (John Martin, correspondent)
"Turning Point: Inside the Struggle: The Amy Biehl Story"
"Peter Jennings Reporting: While America Watched--The Bosnia Tragedy"
 SILVER BATON Blackside Inc., "The Great Depression" on PBS
 SILVER BATON CBS News, "60 Minutes: Semipalatinsk" (Ed Bradley, correspondent)
 SILVER BATON Charles Kuralt, for reporting on CBS News, "Sunday Morning"
 SILVER BATON CNN, Coverage of the Moscow Uprising (Steve Hurst, Claire Shipman, Eileen O’Connor, Gene Randall, Walter Rogers, Hugh Williams)
 SILVER BATON Michael Skoler and NPR for coverage of Rwanda
 SILVER BATON NPR for coverage of South Africa (Ray Suarez, Ann Cooper)
 SILVER BATON PBS, "Frontline: Romeo and Juliet in Sarajevo"
 SILVER BATON Video Verite, "I Am a Promise: The Children of Stanton Elementary School" on HBO
 SILVER BATON WCCO-TV, Minneapolis, Minnesota "Missing the Beat" (Caroline Lowe, reporter)
 SILVER BATON WGBH, "Frontline: Innocence Lost: The Verdict" on PBS (produced by Ofra Bikel)
 SILVER BATON Wisconsin Public Television, "My Promised Land: Bernice Cooper's Story" on PBS
 SILVER BATON WTVS-TV, Detroit, Michigan, HKO Media and Children's Hospital of Michigan  "The Last Hit: Children and Violence"

1996 
Gold Baton: Daniel Schorr, his career spans CBS News, CNN and NPR
ABC News, "Turning Point: Of Human Bondage: Slavery Today"
ABC News, "World News Tonight": American Agenda: "Medicine Man"; "Vanishing Breed"; "Political Waters"
Blackside Inc., "America's War on Poverty" on PBS
Billy Golfus and David E. Simpson, "When Billy Broke His Head...and Other Tales of Wonder" (broadcast on PBS)
Brian Lapping Associates, London, United Kingdom, "Watergate" on The Discovery Channel
NPR for political coverage (such as the work of Elizabeth Arnold)
PBS, the Center for Investigative Reporting and Telesis Productions "Frontline: School Colors"
PBS, "P.O.V., The American Documentary Inc. "Complaints of a Dutiful Daughter"
PBS, "The American Experience: The Battle of the Bulge (produced by Thomas Lennon); FDR (produced by David Grubin); and The Way West" (produced by Ric Burns)
WMAL (AM), Washington, D.C., for "American History -- The Disney Version" (John Matthews, reporter)
WTVJ-TV and Kerry Sanders, Miami, Florida, "Coverage of Haiti"
WXYZ-TV, Detroit, Michigan, "Target 7: Michigan's Secret Soldiers" (Shellee Smith, reporter)

1997 
GOLD BATON Brian Lapping Associates, "Yugoslavia: Death of a Nation" on The Discovery Channel and the BBC
SILVER BATON ABC News, "Nightline: The State vs. Simpson: The Verdict," "Nightline: Journey of a Country Doctor," "Nightline: Town Meeting: Thou Shall Not Kill"
SILVER BATON CBS News, "60 Minutes: Punishing Saddam" (reported by Lesley Stahl), "60 Minutes: Too Good to be True" (reported by Morley Safer)
SILVER BATON HBO, "America Undercover: High on Crack Street: Lost Lives in Lowell," and "The Celluloid Closet" 
SILVER BATON KREM-TV, Spokane, Washington, "The Wenatchee Child Sex Ring"
SILVER BATON NBC News, "Dateline: Class Photo" (Neal Shapiro, John Block, Len Cannon, Geraldine Moriba-Meadows, Marc Rosenwasser)
SILVER BATON Norman Corwin and Mary Beth Kirchner for "Fifty Years After 14 August" on NPR
SILVER BATON NOVA/WGBH-TV, "NOVA: Plague Fighters" (directed by Ric Esther Bienstock) on PBS 
SILVER BATON NPR and Anne Garrels for coverage of the former Soviet Union
SILVER BATON Public Broadcasting Service, "Buckminster Fuller: Thinking Out Loud" (aired on American Masters)
SILVER BATON Radio Smithsonian for "Black Radio: Telling It Like It Was" on PRI
SILVER BATON WFAA-TV, Dallas, Texas, For investigate reporting by Robert Riggs
SILVER BATON WGBH, Frontline, "Shtetl" on PBS

1998 
Gold Baton: WGBH-TV, Boston, Massachusetts, Frontline, for:** "Murder, Money and Mexico
"The Choice 96"
"Secret Daughter"
"Innocence Lost: The Plea" (produced by Ofra Bikel)
ABC News, "Primetime Live: Debt Reckoning"
Blowback Productions, "CIA: America's Secret Warriors"
CBS News, "CBS Reports: Enter the Jury Room", reported by Richard Schlesinger
Center for New America Media, "Vote for Me: Politics in America"
KCET-TV, Los Angeles, California, "The Great War and the Shaping of the 20th Century"
KTCA-TV, St. Paul, Minnesota, Minnesota, "NewsNight Minnesota: Unisys"
KUSC Radio, Los Angeles, "Marketplace" on Public Radio International
NBC News and Scripps Howard News Productions, "Why Can't We Live Together?", reported by Tom Brokaw
Public Broadcasting Service, "Cadillac Desert: An American Nile" 
WABC-TV, New York, "Room 104: The Overcrowding Crisis"
Wisconsin Public Television, "Welcome to Poverty Hollow"

1999 
Gold Baton: WGBH-TV, Boston, "NOVA: Everest: The Death Zone"; "The Brain Eater"; "Supersonic Spies"; "China's Mysterious Mummies"; "Coma"
ABC News and Ted Koppel, "Nightline: Crime and Punishment"
CBS News and Mike Wallace, "60 Minutes: Investigation of the International Pharmaceutical Industry"
CBS News, Eric Engberg and Vince Gonzales, "CBS Evening News: Tomb of the Unknowns" 
Dan Collison, Rebecca Perl and Tom Jennings, "This American Life: Scenes from a Transplant" on PRI
Independent Television Service, Tony Buba and Raymond Henderson, "Struggles in Steel: A Story of African American Steelworkers"
PBS, Laura Angelica Simón and Tracey Trench, "POV: Fear and Learning at Hoover Elementary" 
Thirteen/WNET, New York, and Vanessa Roth, "Taken In: The Lives of America's Foster Children"
WBBM-TV, Chicago, and Carol Marin, "Coverage of Congressman William Lipinski Campaign"
WEWS-TV, Cleveland, and Bill Shiel, "Final Mission"
WMAQ-TV, Chicago, "Strip Searched at O'Hare"
WRAL-TV, Raleigh, and Stuart Watson for a series of investigate reports on military medicine

2000
Gold Baton: Public Affairs Television, "Facing the Truth with Bill Moyers"
ABC News and Diane Sawyer, "20/20: The Unwanted Children of Russia"
CBS News and Bob Simon, "60 Minutes II: The Shame of Srebrenica"
CNN and Candy Crowley, for coverage of the impeachment and trial of President Bill Clinton
Stanley Nelson, "The Black Press: Soldiers without Swords" on PBS 
New England Cable News, Newton, Mass., for in-depth reporting
PBS, "POV: If I Can't Do It"
SoundVision Productions, Berkeley, "The DNA Files" on NPR (hosted by John Hockenberry)
WGBH-TV, Boston, "Frontline: The Triumph of Evil" on PBS 
WMTW-TV, Auburn, Maine & Christine Young for investigative reports on the Christian Civic League
WTHR-TV, Indianapolis, "Guarding the Guardians"
KTVX-TV, Salt Lake City, and Chris Vanocur for investigative reporting on the Olympics’ bribery scandal 
Youth Radio, Berkeley, "Emails from Kosovo" on NPR

2001 
Gold Baton: American RadioWorks, "Massacre at Cuska" on NPR
ABC News, "Nightline: AIDS in Africa"
CBS News, "CBS Evening News: Armed America"
Crowing Rooster Arts, New York, "Abandoned: The Betrayal of America's Immigrants" on WGBH-TV (aired on Independent Lens)
KHOU-TV, Houston, "Deadly Tires?" 
KXLY-TV, Spokane, and Tom Grant, "Public Funds, Private Profit" 
Insight News TV, London, Sorious Samura and CNN Productions, "Cry Freetown" 
NBC News, "Dateline: The Paper Chase"
NPR, "Radio Expeditions"
Steeplechase Films, "New York: A Documentary Film" on PBS
WCPO-TV, Cincinnati, and Laurie Quinlivan, for the I-Team stadium investigation
WGBH-TV, Boston, "Frontline: John Paul II: Millennial Pope" on PBS (directed by Helen Whitney)

2002 
ABC News, Terence Wrong and Peter Bull, "Hopkins 24/7" (reported by Sylvia Chase)
CBS News, David Martin and Mary Walsh, for reporting on national security on "CBS Evening News" and "60 Minutes II"
CBS News, Steve Kroft, and Leslie Cockburn, "60 Minutes: America's Worst Nightmare?"
CBS News and Steve Hartman, "CBS Evening News: Everybody Has Story"
CNN, Nic Robertson and Jonathan Miller "Northern Ireland: Dying for Peace" (aired on CNN Presents)
Court TV, "The Interrogation of Michael Crowe"
KCBS-TV, Los Angeles, and Randy Paige, "Poison Paint"
KIRO-TV, Seattle, "Why the Orcas of Puget Sound Are Dying" 
KOLD-TV, Tucson, and Chip Yost, "Exploding Patrol Cars?"
NPR and Peter Overby for campaign finance coverage
Palfreman Film Group and WGBH-TV, Boston, "Frontline/Nova: Harvest of Fear" on PBS
WABC-TV, New York, Jim Hoffer and Daniela Royes, "Caught Off Guard"
WNYC Radio, New York, and Beth Fertig "The Edison Schools Vote"

2003 
Gold Baton: WGBH-TV, Boston, "Frontline," for a series of seven programs on PBS ("Hunting bin Laden,"; "Target America,"; "Looking for Answers,"; "Trail of a Terrorist,"; "Gunning for Saddam,"; "Saudi Time Bomb,"; "Inside the Terror Network,") about the origin and impact of terrorism by Islamic militants 
ABC News Television and Radio for coverage of 9/11 (citing the work of Ann Compton and John Miller) and "Answering Children's Questions" (citing the work of Peter Jennings)
ABC News, "Nightline: Heart of Darkness" (Martin Seemungal, correspondent)
CNN en Español and Jorge Gestoso, "La Doble Desaparecida" 
Court TV and Lumiere Productions, "Ghosts of Attica"
HBO, "In Memorium: New York City, 9/11/01"
KPBS-TV, San Diego, and Lee Harvey, "Culture of Hate: Who are We?"
NBC News and Martin Fletcher,  for coverage of the Israeli-Palestinian conflict
NPR, for coverage of 9/11 and the war in Afghanistan
POV, Tasha Oldman and Small Town Productions, "The Smith Family" on PBS
WBUR-FM, Boston, "Surviving Torture: Inside Out" (Michael Goldfarb, correspondent)
WCVB-TV, Boston, "Chronicle: Beyond the Big Dig" 
WFAA-TV, Dallas, Brett Ship and Mark Smith, "Fake Drugs, Real Lives"
WGBH-TV, Boston, Steeplechase Films and Sierra Club Productions, "American Experience: Ansel Adams: A Documentary Film" on PBS

2004 
ABC News, "Nightline: Tip of the Spear" (Ted Koppel, correspondent)
CBS News, David Martin and Mary Walsh, for coverage of national security
HBO and Maysles Films Inc., "LaLee's Kin: The Legacy of Cotton"
KBCI-TV, Boise, Idaho, "Shake-Up at City Hall"
KHOU-TV, Houston, "Evidence of Errors"
KMGH-TV, Denver, Colorado, "Honor and Betrayal: Scandal at the Academy" (John Ferrugia, reporter)
NPR, for coverage of the war in Iraq (citing the work of John Burnett, Anne Garrels, Steve Inskeep, Christopher Joyce, Mike Shuster, Ivan Watson and Eric Westervelt)
WESH-TV, Orlando, for coverage of the Columbia Space Shuttle disaster
WGBH-TV, Boston, "Frontline: A Dangerous Business" on PBS (Lowell Bergman and David Barstow, correspondents)
WGBH-TV, Boston, "Frontline": Failure to Protect; "The Taking of Logan Marr"; "The Caseworker Files"; and "A National Dialogue" (moderated by John Hockenberry) on PBS
WGBH-TV, Boston, "Frontline: Faith and Doubt at Ground Zero" on PBS (directed by Helen Whitney)
Whitney Dow and Marco Williams, "POV: Two Towns of Jasper" on PBS (about the murder of James Byrd Jr.)
WTVF-TV, Nashville, Tennessee, "Friends in High Places"

2005 
 ABC NEWS and PJ PRODUCTIONS for Jesus and Paul: The Word and the Witness (aired on Peter Jennings Reporting)
 PBS FRONTLINE and WGBH-TV for Ghosts of Rwanda on PBS
 ABC NEWS and PRIMETIME THURSDAY for The Nuclear Smuggling Project (Brian Ross, correspondent)
 DAVID APPLEBY and THE UNIVERSITY OF MEMPHIS for Hoxie: The First Stand on PBS
 FRONTLINE and WGBH-TV for Truth, War and Consequences on PBS
 MSNBC and NATIONAL GEOGRAPHIC ULTIMATE EXPLORER for Liberia: American Dream?
 HBO/CINEMAX REEL LIFE, Victoria Bruce & Karin Hayes for The Kidnapping of Ingrid Betancourt
 LOUISIANA PUBLIC BROADCASTING for Louisiana: Currents of Change
 NBC NEWS and DATELINE for A Pattern of Suspicion (John Larson, correspondent)
 NPR and RADIO DIARIES for Mandela: An Audio History
 WFAA-TV, DALLAS for State of Denial
 WBAP-AM, DALLAS for JFK 40 
 WCNC-TV, CHARLOTTE for Medicaid Dental Centers Investigation

The duPont Jury also announced four finalists for their exemplary broadcast journalism:
 Independent Television Service (ITVS) and Tracy Droz Tragos for "Be Good, Smile Pretty" on PBS (aired on Independent Lens)
 MarketPlace and American Public Media for "Spoils of War" on public radio stations
 NOVA, WGBH-TV and Canadian Broadcasting Corp. for "Crash of Flight 111"
 WISH-TV, Indianapolis, for "Will Your Vote Count?"

2006 
 ABC NEWS for Live Coverage of the Death of Pope John Paul II and the Election of Pope Benedict XVI
 CNBC for The Age of Wal-Mart: Inside America's Most Powerful Company (David Faber, reporter)
 CNN for Coverage of the Tsunami Disaster in South Asia
 FRONTLINE and WGBH, BOSTON, for Al Qaeda's New Front on PBS (Lowell Bergman, correspondent)
 FRONTLINE, WGBH, BOSTON, and The New York Times for "The Secret History of the Credit Card" on PBS (Lowell Bergman, correspondent)
 HBO for Real Sports with Bryant Gumbel: The Sport of Sheikhs (Bernard Goldberg, correspondent)
 North Carolina Public Radio-WUNC, Chapel Hill, for North Carolina Voices: Understanding Poverty
 PRI, WGBH, BOSTON, and BBC WORLD SERVICE for "The World: The Global Race for Stem Cell Therapies"
 The Kitchen Sisters, Jay Allison and NPR for Hidden Kitchens
 THE SUNDANCE CHANNEL, Denis Poncet, Jean-Xavier de Lestrade and Allyson Luchak for "The Staircase"
 WFTS-TV, TAMPA, for Crosstown Expressway Investigation (Mike Mason, reporter)
 WJW, CLEVELAND, for School Bus Bloat (Tom Merriman, reporter)
 WPMI-TV, MOBILE, for For Lauren's Sake (Bruce Mildwurf, reporter)

2007 
 American Masters and WNET, New York, for Bob Dylan: No Direction Home on PBS
 Brook Lapping Productions, London, for Israel and the Arabs: Elusive Peace on PBS
 WGBH's Cape and Islands NPR Stations for Two Cape Cods: Hidden Poverty on the Cape and Islands (Sean Corcoran, reporter) 
 Investigation Discovery, Canadian Broadcasting Corporation and The New York Times for Nuclear Jihad: Can Terrorists Get the Bomb? (Julian Sher, director; William Broad and David E. Sanger, reporters)
 Frontline and WGBH, Boston, for The Age of AIDS on PBS (Renata Simone, reporter; Greg Barker and William Cran, directors)
 HBO, Jon Alpert and Matthew O'Neill for Baghdad ER
 ITVS, Lisa Sleeth and Jim Butterworth for Independent Lens: Seoul Train on PBS
 NBC Nightly News and Dateline for Coverage of Hurricane Katrina
 KCET, Los Angeles, KPBS, San Diego, KQED, San Francisco, KVIE, Sacramento, for California Connected: War Stories from Ward 7-D (Lisa McRee, reporter)
 NPR for Coverage of Iraq
 WBAL-TV, Baltimore, for Dirty Secret (John Sherman, reporter)
 WLOX-TV, Biloxi, for Coverage of Hurricane Katrina
 WRAL-TV, Raleigh, for Focal Point: Paper Thin Promise and Standards of Living (Lynda Loveland and David Crabtree, anchors)
 WWL-TV, New Orleans, for Coverage of Hurricane Katrina

2008 
The thirteen awards for 2008 were announced on December 17, 2007, and presented on January 16, 2008.

 CBS News for 60 Minutes: The Mother of All Heists (Steve Kroft, correspondent)
 Chicago Public Radio, Alix Spiegel & PRI for This American Life: Which One of These Is Not Like the Others?
 PBS, Florentine Films/Hott Productions & WETA-TV, Washington, DC, for Through Deaf Eyes
 HBO, Ricki Stern & Annie Sundberg for The Trials of Darryl Hunt
 KHOU-TV, Houston, for Rules of the Game (Jeremy Rogalski, reporter)
 KMOV-TV, St. Louis, for Left Behind: The Failure of East St. Louis Schools (Craig Cheatham, reporter)
 KNOE-TV, Monroe, Louisiana, for Names, Ranks and Serial Plunder: The National Guard and Katrina (Taylor Henry, reporter)
 MSNBC & Richard Engel for War Zone Diary
 NBC News for Dateline: The Education of Ms. Groves (Hoda Kotb, correspondent)
 NPR & Daniel Zwerdling for Mental Anguish and the Military
 PBS, Paladin Invision, London, & WETA-TV, Washington, DC, for Jihad: The Men and Ideas Behind Al Qaeda (William Cran, director) (aired on America at a Crossroads) 
 WBBM-TV, for Fly At Your Own Risk (Dave Savini, reporter)
 WFAA-TV, for Television Justice (Byron Harris, reporter)

2009 
Television: Golden Baton Winner
 WFAA-TV in Dallas for "Money for Nothing", "A Passing Offense", "The Buried and the Dead" (Byron Harris, Brett Shipp, reporters)

Television & Radio, Silver Baton Winners
 ABC News / Nightline for "The Other War: Afghanistan" (Sebastian Junger, reporter; Tim Hetherington, photographer; Brian Ross, correspondent)
 California Newsreel, San Francisco & Vital Pictures for "Unnatural Causes: Is Inequality Making Us Sick?"
 Chicago Public Radio, PRI, NPR, Alex Blumberg & Adam Davidson for "This American Life: The Giant Pool of Money"
 CNN for "God's Warriors" (Christiane Amanpour, correspondent) (aired on CNN Presents)
 Current TV & Christof Putzel for "From Russia with Hate"
 HBO, Thomas Lennon & Ruby Yang  for Cinemax's Reel Life: The Blood of Yingzhou District
 NPR, All Things Considered, Melissa Block, & Robert Siegel for "Coverage of the Chengdu Earthquake" (Louisa Lim, Anthony Kuhn, correspondents)
 NPR, All Things Considered, for "Sexual Abuse of Native American Women" (Laura Sullivan, correspondent)
 Oregon Public Broadcasting for "The Silent Invasion" (Ed Jahn, producer)
 Safari Media, ITVS, PBS for "Independent Lens, Abduction: The Megumi Yokota Story" (Patty Kim and Chris Sheridan, directors)
 WJLA-TV, Washington, DC for "Drilling for Dollars: Children's Dentistry Investigation" (Roberta Baskin, correspondent)
 WTVT-TV, Tampa for "Small Town Justice" (Doug Smith, reporter)

2010 
Television, Radio, and Web: Silver Baton Winners
 American RadioWorks, Michael Montgomery & Joshua E. S. Phillips for "What Killed Sergeant Gray"
 CBS News & Katie Couric for "The Sarah Palin Interviews"
 CBS News for "CBS Reports: Children of the Recession" (Katie Couric, reporter)
 HBO & Edet Belzberg for "The Recruiter"
 KHOU-TV, Houston & Mark Greenblatt for "Under Fire: Discrimination and Corruption in the Texas National Guard"
 KMGH-TV, Denver & Tony Kovaleski for "33 Minutes to 34 Right"
 MediaStorm & Jonathan Torgovnik for "Intended Consequences"
 NPR, Michele Norris & Steve Inskeep for "The York Project: Race and the 2008 Vote"
 POV, Elizabeth Farnsworth & Patricio Lanfranco for "The Judge and the General," on PBS
 WCAX-TV, Burlington & Kristin Carlson for "Foreigners on the Farm"
 WGBH, Boston, FRONTLINE/World, Sharmeen Obaid-Chinoy & Dan Edge for "PAKISTAN: Children of the Taliban," on PBS
 WSVN-TV, Miami, Carmel Cafiero & Anthony Pineda for "Pill Mills"
 WTVF-TV, Nashville & Phil Williams for "General Sessions Court"
 WWL-TV, New Orleans for "NOAH Housing Program Investigation" (Lee Zurik, reporter)

2011 
Television, Radio, and Digital: Silver Baton Winners
 ABC News, for 20/20, "Brian Ross Investigates: The Coach's Secret"
 BBC America, for "BBC World News America: Haiti's Earthquake" (Matt Frei, Matthew Price, correspondents)
 CBS News, for "60 Minutes: "The Blowout" (Scott Pelley, correspondent)
 KCET, Los Angeles for "Up In Smoke" (parts one, two, and three), "Protected or Neglected?", "Hung Out to Dry?" (John Larson, Steve Lopez, Judy Muller, Vince Gonzales, reporters; Val Zavala, anchor)
 KING-TV, Seattle & Susannah Frame for "Waste on the Water" 
 9News/KUSA-TV, Denver, 9News at 10 for "Keys to the Castle" (Jace Larson, reporter)
 NPR & Laura Sullivan for "Bonding for Profit"
 POV & Geoffrey Smith, "The English Surgeon" on PBS
 The Las Vegas Sun, "Bottoming Out: Gambling Addiction in Las Vegas" (Scott Den Herder, Liz Benston, Patrick Coolican, reporters)
 West Virginia Public Broadcasting, Trey Kay & Deborah George for "The Great Textbook War"
 WGBH, Frontline & Najibullah Quraishi for "Behind Taliban Lines"
 WKOW-TV, Madison & Dan Cassuto for "Who's Protecting You?"
 WTHR-TV, Indianapolis & Bob Segall for "Reality Check: Where are the Jobs?"

2012 
 Al Jazeera English, Fault Lines, "Haiti - Six Months On"
 CBS News: 60 Minutes, "A Relentless Enemy" (Lara Logan, correspondent_
 Danfung Dennis, Impact Partners, Roast Beef Productions, Sabotage Films, Thought Engine and Channel 4 BritDoc Foundation, Hell and Back Again
 Detroit Public Television, "Beyond the Light Switch" 
 HBO & Blowback Productions, "Triangle: Remembering the Fire"
 HBO, "Real Sports with Bryant Gumbel: Head Games" (Bernard Goldberg, correspondent)
 MediaStorm & Walter Astrada, "Undesired" for the Alexia Foundation
 NBC News & Richard Engel, Coverage of the Arab Spring
 The New York Times, "A Year at War" (James Dao, reporter) and "Surviving Haiti's Earthquake: Children" (Brent Renaud & Craig Renaud, reporters)
 WFAA-TV, Dallas & Byron Harris, "Bitter Lessons"
 WGBH-TV, Boston, "NOVA: Japan's Killer Quake" (Richard Burke-Ward, Robert Strange, producers)
 WNYC & Ailsa Chang, "Alleged Illegal Searches by the NYPD"
 WSB-TV, Atlanta & Jodie Fleischer, "Stealing Houses"
 WTVF-TV, Nashville & Phil Williams, "Policing for Profit"

2013 
Source:

 Alison Klayman, Never Sorry LLC, United Expression Media, Sundance Selects, MUSE Film and Television, "Ai Weiwei: Never Sorry" (aired on Independent Lens)
 CBS News and Clarissa Ward, for "CBS Evening News with Scott Pelley: Inside Syria"
 Current TV, Christof Putzel and the Renaud Brothers, "Vangard: Arming the Mexican Cartel"
 KCET, Southern California for "SoCal Connected: Courting Disaster"
 KLAS-TV, Las Vegas for "Desert Underwater"
 Lee Hirsch, The Weinstein Company, Where We Live Films, BeCause Foundation, The Einhorn Family Charitable Trust, The Fledgling Fund, National Center for Learning Disabilities, and the Waitt Institute for Violence Prevention, for Bully (aired on Independent Lens)
 NPR, Deborah Amos, and Kelly McEvers for Coverage of Syria
 StoryCorps, NPR, and POV, for "StoryCorps 9/11"
 USA Today, for "Ghost Factories"
 WGBH, Kartemquin Films, Steve James and Alex Kotlowitz, for "FRONTLINE: The Interrupters
 WGBH, Clover Films and Najibullah Quraishi, for "FRONTLINE: Opium Brides"
 WITF, WHYY and NPR, for "StateImpact Pennsylvania"
 WVUE-TV, New Orleans, and Lee Zurik for "Dirty Deeds", "Hiding Behind the Badge"
 WXYZ-TV, Detroit, for "Wayne County Confidential"

2014 
 American Documentary – POV, Gail Dolgin & Robin Fryday, "The Barber of Birmingham: Foot Soldier of the Civil Rights Movement", on PBS
 CBS News, Newtown Tragedy Coverage
 Center for Investigative Reporting, "Broken Shield"
 ESPN, Outside the Lines: Youth Football Concerns (Tom Farrey, Paula Lavigne, reporters)
 KMGH-TV, Denver & Keli Rabon, Colorado Rape Victims: Evidence Ignored, Justice Denied
 KSHB 41 Action News, Kansas City, "Tragedy on the Plaza" (Keith King, Ryan Kath, & Melissa Yeager, reporters)
 NBC News, "Devastation in Oklahoma"
 Scott Thurman & Silver Lining Film Group, Magic Hour Entertainment, Naked Edge Films, "The Revisionaries" on Independent Lens
 U. C. Berkeley IRP, CIR, FRONTLINE & UNIVISION, "Rape in the Fields/Violación de un Sueño"
 WBEZ Chicago, This American Life: "Harper High School Parts 1 and 2" (Ben Calhoun, Alex Kotlowitz, Linda Lutton, reporters)
 WBZ-TV, Boston, Boston Marathon Bombings Coverage
 WFAA-TV, Dallas & Byron Harris, "Denticaid: Medicaid Dental Abuse in Texas"
 WVUE-TV, New Orleans & Lee Zurik, "Body of Evidence"
 WYPR, Baltimore, "The Lines Between Us" (Sheilah Kast & Tom Hall, hosts)

2015 
 CNN, WEED: Dr. Sanjay Gupta Reports 
 KPNX 12 News, Phoenix & Wendy Halloran, Raked Over the Coals 
 MPR News, Betrayed by Silence 
 Netflix, Virunga 
 NPR & Joseph Shapiro, Guilty and Charged 
 PBS, The African Americans: Many Rivers to Cross with Henry Louis Gates, Jr. 
 Particle Fever
 Planet Money & NPR Visuals, Planet Money Makes a T-shirt 
 The Seattle Times, Sea Change: The Pacific's Perilous Turn 
 WFTS-TV, Tampa Bay, Incapacitated: Florida's Guardianship Program 
 WGBH-TV, Boston, FRONTLINE: Syria's Second Front 
 WGBH-TV, Boston, FRONTLINE: United States of Secrets 
 WLTX-TV, Columbia, DDS: When the System Fails 
 WTSP 10 News, Tampa Bay, Short Yellows and the Red Light Fight

2016 
 ABC News, Bruce Jenner: The Interview (aired on 20/20)
 Al Jazeera America & Kartemquin Films, Hard Earned 
 CBS News 60 Minutes, A Crime Against Humanity (Scott Pelley, reporter) 
 Cronkite News & Arizona PBS, Hooked: Tracking Heroin's Hold on Arizona 
 FRONTLINE PBS, Ebola Outbreak (produced by Wael Dabbous) & Outbreak (Dan Edge & Sasha Joelle Achilli, producers)
 FRONTLINE PBS, Growing Up Trans (Miri Navasky, Karen O'Connor, producers)
 HBO, Going Clear: Scientology and the Prison of Belief 
 HBO Real Sports with Bryant Gumbel, The Price of Glory (David Scott, correspondent)
 KMO-TV & Craig Cheatham, The Injustice System: Cops, Courts and Greedy Politicians 
 Milwaukee Journal Sentinel, A Watershed Moment: Great Lakes at a Crossroads (Dan Egan, reporter)
 VICE News, Selfie Soldiers: Russia's Army Checks into Ukraine (Simon Ostrovsky, correspondent)
 WBAL-TV & Jayne Miller, Freddie Gray Investigation 
 WBEZ & This American Life, Serial: Season One 
 WETA-TV, Cancer: The Emperor of All Maladies 
 WNYC, NYPD Bruised 
 WRAL-TV, Journey Alone 
 Specialist Finalist Citation: KCBS Radio, Unholy Water

2017 
 CBS News, Nowhere to Go, Europe's Migrant Crisis (Charlie D'Agata, Mark Phillips, & Holly Williams, correspondents)
 Dateline NBC , The Cosby Accusers Speak (Kate Snow, correspondent)
 ESPN Films and Laylow Films, O.J.: Made in America
 Fusion, The Naked Truth: Death by Fentanyl
 Frontline - PBS, Escaping ISIS and Children of Syria
 The GroundTruth Project, Foreverstan: The Girls’ School and Razia's Way
 HBO Documentary Films and SOC Films, A Girl in the River: The Price of Forgiveness
 KXAN, Racial Profiling Whitewash
 Michigan Radio, Not Safe to Drink
 NBC Connecticut, Crumbling Foundations
 NOVA and WGBH-TV, Mystery Beneath the Ice
 NPR & Daniel Zwerdling | Colorado Public Radio & Michael de Yoanna, Missed Treatment
 WTHR-TV, Charity Caught on Camera
 WXIA-TV, Alive Atlanta, Dying for Help: Fixing the Nation's Emergency Response System

2018 
 ABC15 Arizona, Cash for Compliance
 ABC News, Lincoln Square Productions, Let It Fall: Los Angeles 1982-1992
 American Documentary and WORLD Channel - PBS, AMERICA REFRAMED: Class of ‘27
 CBS News, 60 Minutes: The New Cold War
 CBS Evening News, The Road to Aleppo
 Frontline - PBS, Exodus
 HBO Real Sports With Bryant Gumbel, The Lords of the Rings
 KARE 11, Investigative Reporting
 KHOU-TV, Transparency
 National Geographic Documentary Films and Junger Quested Films, Hell on Earth: The Fall of Syria and the Rise of ISIS
 NBC Bay Area (KNTV), Arrested at School
 Netflix, Forward Movement, Kandoo Films, 13th
 The New York Times, The Daily
 Reveal from The Center for Investigative Reporting and PRX, and Coda Story, Russia's New Scapegoats
 This American Life, Episode 600: Will I Know Anyone At This Party? Act One: Party in the USA 
 WITI-TV, Men on the Margin

2019 
Gold Baton: Frontline, Bitter Rivals: Iran and Saudi Arabia, Life on Parole, Living with Murder, Mosul, Myanmar's Killing Fields, Putin's Revenge, The Gang Crackdown and The Last Generation
Florentine Films & WETA, The Vietnam War
Reveal, PRX, PBS NewsHour, Associated Press, Kept Out
60 Minutes, The Washington Post, The Whistleblower & Too Big to Prosecute
WTSP, The Tampa Bay Times, Zombie Campaigns
WNYC, ProPublica, Trump Inc.
CNN Films, RBG
NBC Bay Area, Nima Elbagir, Drivers Under Siege
HBO, Mariska Hargitay, Trish Adlesic, Geeta Gandbhir, I Am Evidence
RYOT, Alexandria Bombach, Nadia Murad, On Her Shoulders
This American Life, Our Town
EPIX, This Is Home
WNYC, Caught: The Lives of Juvenile Justice
CBS Miami WFOR, The Everglades: Where Politics, Money and Race Collide
Rocky Mountain PBS' Insight with John Ferrugia, Imminent Danger

2020 
APM Reports, In the Dark, Season Two: Supreme Court Coverage
CBS News, 60 Minutes, On the Border (parts one and two)
CNN, The Disappearance of Jamal Khashoggi
Frontline, ProPublica, PBS, Documenting Hate
Frontline, The Facebook Dilemma
KARE 11, Love Them First: Lessons from Lucy Laney Elementary & On the Veterans Best (A.J. Lagoe, reporter)
Netflix, The Bleeding Edge
PBS Newshour, Inside Yemen
POV & American Documentary, Inc., The Apology
POV, Dark Money
Michigan Radio & NPR, Believed
MSNBC, Bag Man
WKBW-TV, Fall From Grace: When Priests Prey and Bishops Betray
WETA, McGee Media & Inkwell Films, Reconstruction: After The Civil War
WSOC-TV, Something Suspicious in District 9

2021 
American Experience, PBS, Chasing the Moon
Frontline, PBS, For Sama
KING-TV, Bob's Choice
KSTP-TV, George Floyd coverage
NBCNews.com, A Different Kind of Force—Policing Mental Illness
Netflix, Crip Camp
NOVA, PBS, Decoding COVID-19
Radiotopia, Public Radio Exchange, Ear Hustle
The Washington Post, Lafayette Reconstruction
Upper East Films and Independent Lens, PBS, Bedlam
Vice, Showtime, India Burning
WFAA, Verify Road Trip: Climate Truth
WNBC, The Epicenter of the Coronavirus Pandemic
OSM Audio, Radiolab, WNYC Studios, The Flag and the Fury
Radiolab, WNYC Studios, The Other Latif

2022 
 99% Invisible, Stitcher Media, and PRX, According to Need (hosted by Katie Mingle)
 The History Channel, WNYC Studios, and KOSU, Blindspot: Tulsa Burning (hosted by KalaLea)
 KARE, KARE11 Investigates: Cruel & Unusual (A.J. Lagoe, reporter)
 The New York Times, Day of Rage: How Trump Supporters Took the U.S. Capitol
 KXTV, Fire - Power - Money: Holding PG&E Accountable (Brandon Rittiman, reporter)
 KNXV-TV, Full Disclosure and Politically Charged (Dave Biscobing, reporter)
 HBO Documentary Films, In the Same Breath
 CBS News, Military Sexual Assault: Norah O'Donnell Investigates
 KNTV, The Moms of Magnolia Street
 Amazon Studios, Participant Media, and Storyville Films, My Name is Pauli Murray
 PBS, Independent Lens, and TOPIC, Philly D.A.
 POV, American Documentary, and LBx Africa, Softie
 Apple and Jigsaw Productions, The Line (hosted by Dan Taberski)
 Vice News, The Shockwave (Lama Al-Arian, correspondent)
 POV, American Documentary, and Third Shift Media, Through the Night
 NPR, Planet Money, and Frontline, Waste Land (Laura Sullivan, correspondent)

See also
The Peabody Awards
Academy Award for Best Documentary Feature
The Pulitzer Prizes

References

External links
 Official site
 Award Winners Archive
 "Telling the Truth—The Best in Broadcast Journalism", PBS, Maria Hinojosa. Documentary on the 2010 Dupont award winners.

Alfred I. du Pont
American journalism awards
Awards established in 1942
Awards and prizes of Columbia University
Columbia University Graduate School of Journalism
1942 establishments in New York (state)